1952 in professional wrestling describes the year's events in the world of professional wrestling.

List of notable promotions 
Only one promotion held notable shows in 1952.

Calendar of notable shows

Championship changes

EMLL

NWA

Debuts
Debut date uncertain:
Shirley Crabtree
Brute Bernard
Espanto II
Fritz Von Erich
Jackie Fargo
John Tolos
Ray Stevens
Ricky Romero
Waldo Von Erich
February 13  Gene Kiniski

Births
January 3  Jim Ross
February 1  Dennis Condrey
March 2  Sandy Parker
March 23  Villano III(died in 2018)
May 14  Scott Irwin(died in 1987) 
May 21  Mr. T
June 6  Moondog Spot (died in 2003) 
June 19  El Canek
June 27  Randy Hogan 
June 30  Nightmare Danny Davis
July 5  Hillbilly Jim
July 7  Mando Guerrero
August 4  Dick the Brusier Jr. 
September 3  Black Terry
September 6  Javier Llanes
September 12  Silo Sam (died in 2005) 
September 14  Bobo Brazil Jr. 
September 19  Paco Alonso(died in 2019) 
September 22:
Gran Cochisse
Américo Rocca
September 25  Jimmy Garvin
October 6  Rip Oliver (died in 2020) 
October 14  Dan Spivey
November 4 Larry Cameron(died in 1993)
November 9  Joyce Grable
November 15  Randy Savage(died in 2011) 
November 19  Ricky Gibson (died in 2006)
November 22  George Weingeroff
November 27  Buddy Rose(died in 2009) 
November 29  Jules Strongbow 
December 12  Gary Michael Cappetta
December 13  Junkyard Dog(died in 1998)

Deaths
 June 13- Alex Kasaboski, 41
 December 25- Charles Cutler (wrestler), 68

References

 
professional wrestling